Glenn Vincent Redmon (born January 11, 1948) is a former Major League Baseball second baseman who appeared in seven games for the San Francisco Giants in . He batted and threw right-handed.

Redmon was drafted by the Chicago White Sox in the nineteenth round of the 1969 Major League Baseball Draft out of the University of Michigan where he had been a member of Sigma Pi fraternity. While at Michigan, he spent the summers of 1967 and 1968 playing in Sturgis, South Dakota for the Sturgis Titans of the Basin League. In four seasons in Chicago's farm system, he batted .266 with 22 home runs. He was traded along with Chuck Hartenstein from the White Sox to the Giants for Skip Pitlock on February 8, .

Redmon's finest season was 1974 with the Phoenix Giants when he batted .312 with six home runs and 76 runs batted in to earn a call up to San Francisco that September. He went 2-for-4 with two doubles and an RBI in his major league debut against the Atlanta Braves.

References

External links

1948 births
Baseball players from Detroit
San Francisco Giants players
Living people
Appleton Foxes players
Asheville Tourists players
Duluth-Superior Dukes players
Florida Instructional League White Sox players
Michigan Wolverines baseball players
Mobile White Sox players
Phoenix Giants players
Tucson Toros players
Williamsport Tomahawks players